Abdurrahman Sharafkandi, known by his pen name  Hazhar or Hajar (Hazhar) (April 13, 1921 – February 21, 1991), was a renowned Kurdish writer, poet, lexicographer, linguist, and translator, from Iran. Some sources of Sharafkandi birthplace have been mentioned in the village of Sharafkand, which is a district of Bukan .

He was also the brother of the late Kurdish politician Dr. Sadeq Sharafkandi (1938–1992). Dr. Sharafkandi was the second General Secretary of the Kurdistan Democratic Party of Iran (PDKI).

Biography
Hejar was born in Bukan in north-western Iran. He began religious studies in early childhood, but was forced to abandon it when he lost his father at the age of 17. He started writing poems in Kurdish around 1940.Through his readings, he came under the influence of famous Kurdish poets such as Malaye Jaziri, Ahmad Khani, Wafaei and Haji Qadir Koyi. He was involved in the Kurdish movement led by Qazi Muhammad and was appointed as one of the official poets of the Republic of Mahabad in 1946. After the fall of the republic, he was forced into exile. For about 30 years, he lived in different countries such as Iraq, Syria, Lebanon and Egypt. In Iraq, he became involved in the nationalist movement led by Mustafa Barzani, with whom he developed a close friendship. In 1975, after the defeat of the movement, he moved back to Iran, and settled in the city of Karaj, where he lived until his death on February 22, 1990. He is buried in Mahabad.

Works
Hejar was one of the most prolific Kurdish writers. He wrote 24 books and is credited with many works, among which are the editing and commentary of poems of Malaye Jaziri in Sorani Kurdish, a translation of Khani's works into Sorani Kurdish, a translation of Koran into Kurdish, the first Kurdish-Persian dictionary in Iran, and the translation of the poems of Khayyam into Kurdish, maintaining Khayyam's rhythm. One of Hejar's most beloved poems, "Forever a Kurd," translated into English by Tyler Fisher and Haidar Khezri, appears in Essential Voices: Poetry of Iran and Its Diaspora (Green Linden Press, 2021), p. 133.

Books
Alekok
Vergêra MemoZîn bi soranî ( Translation of Mem û Zîn from Kurmanji into sorani Kurdish )
Translation of Sharafnama from Persian into Sorani Kurdish.
Dîwana helbesta Bu Kurdistan (Collection of Poems: For Kurdistan)
Çarînekanî Xeyam (Translation of Khayyam's Quatrains from Persian into Kurdish)
Henbane Borîne (Kurdish-Kurdish-Persian Dictionary)
Vergêra Quranê bi Kurdî ( Translation of Koran into Kurdish)
Translation of The Canon of Medicine by Avicenna from Arabic into Persian.
Şerha Dîwana Melayê Cizîrî (Editing and Commentary on the Poems of Malaye Jaziri)
Sifra bê biraneve (vergêra pirtûka Şerîetî ) (Translation of One and Zeroes without end by Ali Shariati from Persian into Kurdish)
Çêştî Micêvir( serbihorî ) (Autobiography)

Articles
Keith Hitchins (2003), "HAŽĀR" in Encyclopædia Iranica, Online Edition. (accessdate April 4, 2011)
Hazhar, Abdul Rahman, Le mer jiyan û beserhatî Hejar bwêjî Kurd (On the life and biography of Hazhar, the Kurdish poet), in Eiiubi & Smirnova, pp. 142–85, 1968.
Hazhar, Abdul Rahman,Kurd û Serbexoî Ziman, Govarî Korî Zaniyarî Kurd (The Journal of the Kurdish Scientific Council), Vol 2., Part 1, pp. 280–320, 1974.

References

Mamosta Hejar, by Seyid Feysel Moctevî in Kurdish

External link

1921 births
1991 deaths
People from Mahabad
Kurdish nationalists
Kurdish poets
Kurdish-language writers
Democratic Party of Iranian Kurdistan politicians
Kurdish scholars
20th-century Iranian poets